Hermann Klaus Hugo Weyl,  (9 November 1885 – 8 December 1955) was a German mathematician, theoretical physicist and philosopher. Although much of his working life was spent in Zürich, Switzerland, and then Princeton, New Jersey, he is associated with the University of Göttingen tradition of mathematics, represented by Carl Friedrich Gauss, David Hilbert and Hermann Minkowski.

His research has had major significance for theoretical physics as well as purely mathematical disciplines such as number theory. He was one of the most influential mathematicians of the twentieth century, and an important member of the Institute for Advanced Study during its early years.

Weyl contributed to an exceptionally wide range of mathematical fields, including works on space, time, matter, philosophy, logic, symmetry and the history of mathematics. He was one of the first to conceive of combining general relativity with the laws of electromagnetism. Freeman Dyson wrote that Weyl alone bore comparison with the "last great universal mathematicians of the nineteenth century", Poincaré and Hilbert. Michael Atiyah, in particular, has commented that whenever he examined a mathematical topic, he found that Weyl had preceded him.

Biography
Hermann Weyl was born in Elmshorn, a small town near Hamburg, in Germany, and attended the Gymnasium Christianeum in Altona. His father, Ludwig Weyl, was a banker; whereas his mother, Anna Weyl (née Dieck), came from a wealthy family.

From 1904 to 1908 he studied mathematics and physics in both Göttingen and Munich. His doctorate was awarded at the University of Göttingen under the supervision of David Hilbert, whom he greatly admired.

In September 1913 in Göttingen, Weyl married Friederike Bertha Helene Joseph (March 30, 1893 – September 5, 1948) who went by the name Helene (nickname "Hella"). Helene was a daughter of Dr. Bruno Joseph (December 13, 1861 – June 10, 1934), a physician who held the position of Sanitätsrat in Ribnitz-Damgarten, Germany. Helene was a philosopher (she was a disciple of phenomenologist Edmund Husserl) and a translator of Spanish literature into German and English (especially the works of Spanish philosopher José Ortega y Gasset).  It was through Helene's close connection with Husserl that Hermann became familiar with (and greatly influenced by) Husserl's thought. Hermann and Helene had two sons, Fritz Joachim Weyl (February 19, 1915 – July 20, 1977) and Michael Weyl (September 15, 1917 – March 19, 2011), both of whom were born in Zürich, Switzerland. Helene died in Princeton, New Jersey on September 5, 1948. A memorial service in her honor was held in Princeton on September 9, 1948. Speakers at her memorial service included her son Fritz Joachim Weyl and mathematicians Oswald Veblen and Richard Courant. In 1950 Hermann married sculptress Ellen Bär (née Lohnstein) (April 17, 1902 – July 14, 1988), who was the widow of professor Richard Josef Bär (September 11, 1892 – December 15, 1940) of Zürich.

After taking a teaching post for a few years, Weyl left Göttingen in 1913 for Zürich to take the chair of mathematics at the ETH Zürich, where he was a colleague of Albert Einstein, who was working out the details of the theory of general relativity. Einstein had a lasting influence on Weyl, who became fascinated by mathematical physics. In 1921 Weyl met Erwin Schrödinger, a theoretical physicist who at the time was a professor at the University of Zürich. They were to become close friends over time.  Weyl had some sort of childless love affair with Schrödinger's wife Annemarie (Anny) Schrödinger (née Bertel), while at the same time Anny was helping raise an illegitimate daughter of Erwin's named Ruth Georgie Erica March, who was born in 1934 in Oxford, England.

Weyl was a Plenary Speaker of the International Congress of Mathematicians (ICM) in 1928 at Bologna and an Invited Speaker of the ICM in 1936 at Oslo. He was elected a fellow of the American Physical Society in 1928 and a member of the National Academy of Sciences in 1940. For the academic year 1928–1929 he was a visiting professor at Princeton University, where he wrote a paper, "On a problem in the theory of groups arising in the foundations of infinitesimal geometry," with Howard P. Robertson.

Weyl left Zürich in 1930 to become Hilbert's successor at Göttingen, leaving when the Nazis assumed power in 1933, particularly as his wife was Jewish. He had been offered one of the first faculty positions at the new Institute for Advanced Study in Princeton, New Jersey, but had declined because he did not desire to leave his homeland. As the political situation in Germany grew worse, he changed his mind and accepted when offered the position again. He remained there until his retirement in 1951. Together with his second wife Ellen, he spent his time in Princeton and Zürich, and died from a heart attack on December 8, 1955, while living in Zürich.

Weyl was cremated in Zürich on December 12, 1955. His ashes remained in private hands until 1999, at which time they were interred in an outdoor columbarium vault in the Princeton Cemetery. The remains of Hermann's son Michael Weyl (1917–2011) are interred right next to Hermann's ashes in the same columbarium vault.

Weyl was a pantheist.

Contributions

Distribution of eigenvalues

In 1911 Weyl published Über die asymptotische Verteilung der Eigenwerte (On the asymptotic distribution of eigenvalues) in which he proved that the eigenvalues of the Laplacian in the compact domain are distributed according to the so-called Weyl law. In 1912 he suggested a new proof, based on variational principles. Weyl returned to this topic several times, considered elasticity system and formulated the Weyl conjecture. These works started an important domain—asymptotic distribution of eigenvalues—of modern analysis.

Geometric foundations of manifolds and physics

In 1913, Weyl published Die Idee der Riemannschen Fläche (The Concept of a Riemann Surface), which gave a unified treatment of Riemann surfaces. In it Weyl utilized point set topology, in order to make Riemann surface theory more rigorous, a model followed in later work on manifolds. He absorbed L. E. J. Brouwer's early work in topology for this purpose.

Weyl, as a major figure in the Göttingen school, was fully apprised of Einstein's work from its early days. He tracked the development of relativity physics in his Raum, Zeit, Materie (Space, Time, Matter) from 1918, reaching a 4th edition in 1922. In 1918, he introduced the notion of gauge, and gave the first example of what is now known as a gauge theory. Weyl's gauge theory was an unsuccessful attempt to model the electromagnetic field and the gravitational field as geometrical properties of spacetime. The Weyl tensor in Riemannian geometry is of major importance in understanding the nature of conformal geometry.  In 1929, Weyl introduced the concept of the vierbein into general relativity.

His overall approach in physics was based on the phenomenological philosophy of Edmund Husserl, specifically Husserl's 1913 Ideen zu einer reinen Phänomenologie und phänomenologischen Philosophie. Erstes Buch: Allgemeine Einführung in die reine Phänomenologie  (Ideas of a Pure Phenomenology and Phenomenological Philosophy. First Book: General Introduction). Husserl had reacted strongly to Gottlob Frege's criticism of his first work on the philosophy of arithmetic and was investigating the sense of mathematical and other structures, which Frege had distinguished from empirical reference.

Topological groups, Lie groups and representation theory

From 1923 to 1938, Weyl developed the theory of compact groups, in terms of matrix representations. In the compact Lie group case he proved a fundamental character formula.

These results are foundational in understanding the symmetry structure of quantum mechanics, which he put on a group-theoretic basis. This included spinors. Together with the mathematical formulation of quantum mechanics, in large measure due to John von Neumann, this gave the treatment familiar since about 1930. Non-compact groups and their representations, particularly the Heisenberg group, were also streamlined in that specific context, in  his 1927 Weyl quantization, the best extant bridge between
classical and quantum physics to date. From this time, and certainly much helped by Weyl's expositions, Lie groups and Lie algebras became a mainstream part both of pure mathematics and theoretical physics.

His book The Classical Groups reconsidered invariant theory. It covered symmetric groups, general linear groups, orthogonal groups, and symplectic groups and results on their invariants and representations.

Harmonic analysis and analytic number theory

Weyl also showed how to use exponential sums in diophantine approximation, with his criterion for uniform distribution mod 1, which was a fundamental step in analytic number theory. This work applied to the Riemann zeta function, as well as additive number theory. It was developed by many others.

Foundations of mathematics
In The Continuum Weyl developed the logic of predicative analysis using the lower levels of Bertrand Russell's ramified theory of types. He was able to develop most of classical calculus, while using neither the axiom of choice nor proof by contradiction, and avoiding Georg Cantor's infinite sets. Weyl appealed in this period to the radical constructivism of the German romantic, subjective idealist Fichte.

Shortly after publishing The Continuum Weyl briefly shifted his position wholly to the intuitionism of Brouwer. In The Continuum, the constructible points exist as discrete entities. Weyl wanted a continuum that was not an aggregate of points. He wrote a controversial article proclaiming, for himself and L. E. J. Brouwer, a "revolution." This article was far more influential in propagating intuitionistic views than the original works of Brouwer himself.

George Pólya and Weyl, during a mathematicians' gathering in Zürich (9 February 1918), made a bet concerning the future direction of mathematics. Weyl predicted that in the subsequent 20 years, mathematicians would come to realize the total vagueness of notions such as real numbers, sets, and countability, and moreover, that asking about the truth or falsity of the least upper bound property of the real numbers was as meaningful as asking about truth of the basic assertions of Hegel on the philosophy of nature. Any answer to such a question would be unverifiable, unrelated to experience,  and therefore senseless.

However, within a few years Weyl decided that Brouwer's intuitionism did put too great restrictions on mathematics, as critics had always said. The "Crisis" article had disturbed Weyl's formalist teacher Hilbert, but later in the 1920s Weyl partially reconciled his position with that of Hilbert.

After about 1928 Weyl had apparently decided that mathematical intuitionism was not compatible with his enthusiasm for the phenomenological philosophy of Husserl, as he had apparently earlier thought. In the last decades of his life Weyl emphasized mathematics as  "symbolic construction" and moved to a position closer not only to Hilbert but to that of Ernst Cassirer. Weyl however rarely refers to Cassirer, and wrote only brief articles and passages articulating this position.

By 1949, Weyl was thoroughly disillusioned with the ultimate value of intuitionism, and wrote: "Mathematics with Brouwer gains its highest intuitive clarity. He succeeds in developing the beginnings of analysis in a natural manner, all the time preserving the contact with intuition much more closely than had been done before. It cannot be denied, however, that in advancing to higher and more general theories the inapplicability of the simple laws of classical logic eventually results in an almost unbearable awkwardness. And the mathematician watches with pain the greater part of his towering edifice which he believed to be built of concrete blocks dissolve into mist before his eyes." As John L Bell puts it: "It seems to me a great pity that Weyl did not live to see the emergence in the 1970s of smooth infinitesimal analysis, a mathematical framework within which his vision of a true continuum, not “synthesized” from discrete elements, is realized. Although the underlying logic of smooth infinitesimal analysis is  intuitionistic — the law of excluded middle not being generally affirmable — mathematics developed within avoids the “unbearable awkwardness” to which Weyl refers above."

Weyl equation

In 1929, Weyl proposed an equation, known as Weyl equation, for use in a replacement to Dirac equation. This equation describes massless fermions. A normal Dirac fermion could be split into two Weyl fermions or formed from two Weyl fermions. Neutrinos were once thought to be Weyl fermions, but they are now known to have mass. Weyl fermions are sought after for electronics applications. Quasiparticles that behave as Weyl fermions were discovered in 2015, in a form of crystals known as Weyl semimetals, a type of topological material.

Quotes
The question for the ultimate foundations and the ultimate meaning of mathematics remains open; we do not know in which direction it will find its final solution nor even whether a final objective answer can be expected at all. "Mathematizing" may well be a creative activity of man, like language or music, of primary originality, whose historical decisions defy complete objective rationalization.
—Gesammelte Abhandlungen—as quoted in Year book – The American Philosophical Society, 1943, p. 392

In these days the angel of topology and the devil of abstract algebra fight for the soul of each individual mathematical domain. 
Whenever you have to do with a structure-endowed entity S try to determine its group of automorphisms, the group of those element-wise transformations which leave all structural relations undisturbed. You can expect to gain a deep insight into the constitution of S in this way.
—Symmetry Princeton Univ. Press, p144; 1952

Bibliography
 1911. Über die asymptotische Verteilung der Eigenwerte, Nachrichten der Königlichen Gesellschaft der Wissenschaften zu Göttingen, 110–117 (1911).
 1913.  Die Idee der Riemannschen Flāche, 2d 1955. The Concept of a Riemann Surface. Addison–Wesley.
 1918. Das Kontinuum, trans. 1987 The Continuum : A Critical Examination of the Foundation of Analysis. 
 1918. Raum, Zeit, Materie. 5 edns. to 1922 ed. with notes by Jūrgen Ehlers, 1980. trans. 4th edn. Henry Brose, 1922 Space Time Matter, Methuen, rept. 1952 Dover. .
 1923. Mathematische Analyse des Raumproblems.
 1924. Was ist Materie?
 1925. (publ. 1988 ed. K. Chandrasekharan) Riemann's Geometrische Idee.
 1927. Philosophie der Mathematik und Naturwissenschaft, 2d edn. 1949. Philosophy of Mathematics and Natural Science, Princeton 0689702078. With new introduction by Frank Wilczek, Princeton University Press, 2009, .
 1928. Gruppentheorie und Quantenmechanik. transl. by H. P. Robertson, The Theory of Groups and Quantum Mechanics, 1931, rept. 1950 Dover. 
 1929. "Elektron und Gravitation I", Zeitschrift Physik, 56, pp 330–352. – introduction of the vierbein into GR
 1931: The Theory of Groups and Quantum Mechanics," London, : Methuen & Co., [1931]
 1933. The Open World  Yale,  rept. 1989 Oxbow Press 
 1934. Mind and Nature U. of Pennsylvania Press.
 1934. "On generalized Riemann matrices," Ann. Math. 35: 400–415.
 1935. Elementary Theory of Invariants.
 1935. The structure and representation of continuous groups: Lectures at Princeton university during 1933–34.

 1940. Algebraic Theory of Numbers rept. 1998 Princeton U. Press. 
 (text of 1948 Josiah Wilard Gibbs Lecture)
 1952. Symmetry. Princeton University Press. 
 1968. in K. Chandrasekharan ed, Gesammelte Abhandlungen. Vol IV. Springer.

See also

Topics named after Hermann Weyl

 Majorana–Weyl spinor
 Peter–Weyl theorem
 Schur–Weyl duality
 Weyl algebra
 Weyl basis of the gamma matrices
 Weyl chamber
 Weyl character formula
 Weyl equation, a relativistic wave equation
 Weyl expansion
 Weyl fermion
 Weyl gauge
 Weyl gravity
 Weyl notation
 Weyl quantization
 Weyl spinor
 Weyl sum, a type of exponential sum
 Weyl symmetry: see Weyl transformation
 Weyl tensor
 Weyl transform
 Weyl transformation
 Weyl–Schouten theorem
 Weyl's criterion
 Weyl's lemma on hypoellipticity
 Weyl's lemma on the "very weak" form of the Laplace equation

References

Further reading
 ed. K. Chandrasekharan,Hermann Weyl, 1885–1985, Centenary lectures delivered by C. N. Yang, R. Penrose, A. Borel, at the ETH Zürich  Springer-Verlag, Berlin, Heidelberg, New York, London, Paris, Tokyo – 1986,  published for the Eidgenössische Technische Hochschule, Zürich.
Deppert, Wolfgang et al., eds., Exact Sciences and their Philosophical Foundations. Vorträge des Internationalen Hermann-Weyl-Kongresses, Kiel 1985, Bern; New York; Paris: Peter Lang 1988,
Ivor Grattan-Guinness, 2000. The Search for Mathematical Roots 1870-1940. Princeton Uni. Press.
Thomas Hawkins, Emergence of the Theory of Lie Groups, New York: Springer, 2000.
 
In connection with the Weyl–Pólya bet, a copy of the original letter together with some background can be found in: 
Erhard Scholz; Robert Coleman; Herbert Korte; Hubert Goenner; Skuli Sigurdsson; Norbert Straumann eds. Hermann Weyl's Raum – Zeit – Materie and a General Introduction to his Scientific Work (Oberwolfach Seminars) Springer-Verlag New York, New York, N.Y.
Skuli Sigurdsson. "Physics, Life, and Contingency: Born, Schrödinger, and Weyl in Exile." In Mitchell G. Ash, and Alfons Söllner, eds., Forced Migration and Scientific Change: Emigré German-Speaking Scientists and Scholars after 1933 (Washington, D.C.: German Historical Institute and New York: Cambridge University Press, 1996), pp. 48–70.

External links

 National Academy of Sciences biography
 Bell, John L. Hermann Weyl on intuition and the continuum
 Feferman, Solomon. "Significance of Hermann Weyl's das Kontinuum"
 Straub, William O. Hermann Weyl Website
 
 

1885 births
1955 deaths
Burials at Princeton Cemetery
Differential geometers
Academic staff of ETH Zurich
Institute for Advanced Study faculty
Fellows of the American Physical Society
Foreign Members of the Royal Society
German male writers
20th-century German mathematicians
Members of the United States National Academy of Sciences
Number theorists
Linear algebraists
Pantheists
People from Elmshorn
People from the Province of Schleswig-Holstein
German relativity theorists
University of Göttingen alumni
People educated at the Gymnasium Christianeum
20th-century German philosophers